Baratuku refugee settlement is a refugee settlement in Adjumani district Uganda

Background 
This refugee settlement was initially established in 1991.

Gaps & challenges  
According to the Uganda Refugee Response Monitoring Settlement Fact Sheet for Baratuku settlement carried out by the UNCHCR - January 2018, various gaps and challenges have been identified from research carried out and await immediate and sustainable response to by the Government of Uganda and the various implementing NGOs.

Food and nutrition 
This is a persistent challenge since Households are not able to grow sufficient food to supplement their small food rations because their allocated plots are not large enough to cultivate.

Healthcare 
Services to do with health care and sanitation are inadequate for the settlement population. There is only one health center for refugees in Baratuku camp which also serves large

populations of Ugandan nationals and other refugees from Elema settlement  and makes service delivery so slow and insufficient to refugees. It therefore has a greater impact for the young and elderly since they are prone to infections and disease outbreaks.

Education 
The sole secondary school that serves school-age youth in Baratuku refugee settlement is located far away

from the settlement, making it difficult for students to get there. Even for refugee families that live near the school, many have limited

livelihoods opportunities and cannot afford tuition and related school costs which poses a great challenge to the young uneducated generation.

At the Global Refugee Forum, Education Cannot Wait commits to investing in multi-year programmes for refugees and host-community children which initiative seeks to relinquish the refugees of their dire need for educational resources and providence of scholastics, this gives the refugees and Host communities at the Baratuku refugee settlement to enjoy a chance to be free in educational sector reinforcement.

References 

Adjumani District
Refugee camps in Uganda